The Cima Undici - Elferkofel is a mountain in the Sexten Dolomites in South Tyrol, Italy.

References 

Richard Goedeke: Sextener Dolomiten. (Alpine Club Guide) Bergverlag Rother, 1988.

External links 

Mountains of the Alps
Mountains of South Tyrol
Alpine three-thousanders
Sexten Dolomites